Lu Liang-Huan (10 December 1936 – 15 March 2022), also known as Mister Lu (Mr Lu) to British golf fans, was a successful Taiwanese golfer who won several important tournaments on the Asian and European circuits between 1959 and 1987.

Early life and professional career
Lu was born in Taipei. He became the first winner of the Hong Kong Open in 1959, the tournament devised by former Australian Open champion Eric Cremin and featuring, among others, Bob Charles and Kel Nagle. He would become a regular winner on the Far East Circuit, later known as the Asia Golf Circuit, winning his own country's national Open on four occasions and the overall circuit title in 1966 and 1967. He also played on the Japan Golf Tour, winning nine times between 1971 and 1987.

His finest year was 1971, when he finished runner-up to Lee Trevino in The Open at Royal Birkdale, then the following week won the Open de France at Biarritz, becoming the first Taiwanese and Asian golfer to win on the European Tour. He also won in Thailand and Japan that season. In 1972, he and countryman Hsieh Min-Nan teamed up to win the World Cup at Royal Melbourne Golf Club, Taiwan's sole victory in the event.

Personal life
Lu's nephew, Lu Hsi-chuen, also had a successful career as a professional golfer.

Death
Lu died at Taipei Veterans General Hospital on 15 March 2022, at the age of 85.

Professional wins (29)

Japan Golf Tour wins (8)

1Co-sanctioned by the Asia Golf Circuit

Japan Golf Tour playoff record (4–1)

Other Japan wins (4)
1971 The Crowns Tournament
1972 Kuzuha International
1973 Hokuriku Classic
1976 Sanpo Champions Tournament

Asia Golf Circuit wins (9)
1965 Philippine Open
1966 Taiwan Open
1971 Thailand Open
1974 Philippine Open, Hong Kong Open
1978 Philippine Open
1979 Taiwan Open
1983 Taiwan Open
1985 Taiwan Open

Other Taiwan wins (6)
1970 Republic of China PGA Championship
1975 Republic Of China PGA Championship
1977 Republic Of China PGA Championship
1979 Republic Of China PGA Championship, Kaohsiung Open
1987 Xinfeng Open

Other wins (4)
1959 Hong Kong Open
1971 French Open
1972 World Cup (team with Hsieh Min-Nan), Panama Open

Results in major championships

Note: Lu only played in the Masters Tournament and The Open Championship.

CUT = missed the half-way cut
"T" indicates a tie for a place

Team appearances
World Cup (representing Chinese Taipei): 1956, 1962, 1966, 1967, 1968, 1971, 1972, 1973, 1974, 1980
Dunhill Cup (representing Taiwan): 1985

References

External links

Lu Liang-Huan at the Taiwan PGA official website (in Chinese)

Taiwanese male golfers
Japan Golf Tour golfers
Sportspeople from New Taipei
1936 births
2022 deaths